Ginger Lily is a common name for several plants and may refer to:

 Alpinia
 Hedychium